Implosion  is a science fiction novel by British writer D. F. Jones, published in 1967, set in a United Kingdom just attacked by an unnamed minor Eastern Bloc country. The weapon used, 'Prolix', is a chemical sterilant, that, once ingested, renders most women sterile.

The protagonists are the Minister for Health, Dr. John Bart, M.D., and his wife Julia; he soon finds his Ministry is the most important government entity in the new, post-attack Britain, while his wife is one of the country's few remaining fertile women. In the end, as the Minister for Health, Dr. Bart finds himself creating a new society where fertile women are herded to concentration camps, to spend the rest of their lives reproducing.

Meanwhile, the rest of the world are shooting Prolix at each other, gradually reducing their populations to Britain's circumstance. At story's end, mankind learns that the genetic quirk that kept some women fertile allows them to only bear boys, thus dooming humanity to extinction.

External links 

1967 British novels
1967 science fiction novels
Post-apocalyptic novels
Novels by D. F. Jones
Rupert Hart-Davis books